Weiming Shen is Chinese engineer and academic working as a professor at the Huazhong University of Science and Technology and University of Western Ontario.

Education 
Shen earned Bachelor of Science and Master of Science degrees in mechanical engineering from Beijing Jiaotong University and a PhD in system control from the University of Technology of Compiègne.

Career 
Prior to 2019, Shen was a principal research officer with the National Research Council Canada  He was named a Fellow of the Institute of Electrical and Electronics Engineers (IEEE) in 2013 for his contributions to agent-based collaboration technologies and applications. Shen is also a fellow of the Canadian Academy of Engineering.

References

External links

20th-century births
Living people
Fellow Members of the IEEE
Fellows of the Canadian Academy of Engineering
Year of birth missing (living people)
Place of birth missing (living people)

Beijing Jiaotong University alumni
Academic staff of Huazhong University of Science and Technology
Academic staff of the University of Western Ontario